Ungellidae is a family of nematodes belonging to the order Rhabditida.

Genera

Genera:
 Acanthungella Ivanova & Hope, 2004
 Adungella Timm, 1967
 Chabaudigella Ivanova & Bain, 2012

References

Nematodes